Hermonassa sinuata is a moth of the family Noctuidae first described by Frederic Moore in 1881. It is found in India.

References

Noctuinae
Moths of Asia